Coptaspis elegans is an Australian species of bush cricket in the tribe Agraeciini.

References

External links 

 

Conocephalinae
Insects described in 1966